Tiny Metal is a turn-based tactics video game developed by Area 35 and published by Unties. It was released for PlayStation 4, Nintendo Switch, and Windows in December 2017. 

A follow-up, Tiny Metal: Full Metal Rumble, was released in July 2019 on Nintendo Switch and PC.

Gameplay
Tiny Metal is a military-themed turn-based tactics video game.

Development
Tiny Metal is the debut game from Japanese video game development studio Area 35. The studio was founded in August 2016 by Hiroaki Yura who directed the game. At the game's release the studio had six full-time developers. Key influences of the game include Advance Wars and Warhammer 40,000.

The game was released on PlayStation 4, Nintendo Switch and Windows on 21 December 2017. The game was published by Unties, an indie gaming label that is part of Sony Music.

ReceptionTiny Metal'' received "mixed or average" reviews from critics according to review aggregator Metacritic.

References

External links
 

2017 video games
Turn-based tactics video games
Windows games
PlayStation 4 games
Nintendo Switch games
Video games developed in Japan